Kola Kardeh may refer to:
 Kola Kardeh, Abbasabad
 Kola Kardeh, Sari